Ștefanca may refer to several villages in Romania:

 Ștefanca, a village in Bistra Commune, Alba County
 Ștefanca, a village in Miheșu de Câmpie Commune, Mureș County